Mikheil Ivanovich Tumanishvili, born 6 february 1921, died 11 May 1996, was a Georgian theater director and teacher. He was a student of Georgy Tovstonogov at the Tbilisi State Theater Institute and graduated in 1948. Tumanishvili is the founder of 1978 established Tumanishvili Film Actors Theatre in Tbilisi. As a director, his work was mostly based on improvisation.

References

External links 
Tumanishvili Film Actors Theatre Official Homepage

1921 births
1996 deaths
Burials at Didube Pantheon
Theatre people from Tbilisi
Theatre directors from Georgia (country)
Recipients of the USSR State Prize
Soviet theatre directors